Ozias Thurston Linley (1765–1831) was one of seven musical siblings born to the composer Thomas Linley the elder and his wife Mary Johnson.

He graduated at Corpus Christi College, Oxford in 1789, becoming a minor canon of Norwich Cathedral the following year and Junior Fellow and Organist at Dulwich College from 1816.  He was noted for his eccentricity and strong language.

References

1765 births
1831 deaths
Alumni of Corpus Christi College, Oxford
History of Norwich
Ozias
18th-century English Anglican priests
19th-century English Anglican priests
People from Bath, Somerset